Pålsbufjorden is a lake in the municipalities of Hol and Nore og Uvdal, both in Buskerud County, Norway. The water table lies 749 meters above sea level. The Pålsbu kraftverk hydro-electric plant was built to extract power from the water that draining from Pålsbufjorden down into Tunhovdfjorden. The power plant, which went into operation during 2007, is designed as a turbine from above and is built in concrete. It is located just below Pålsbufjorden dam. Pålsbufjorden and Tunhovdfjorden are both part of the  Numedalslågen watershed.

References

Hol
Nore og Uvdal
Lakes of Viken (county)